Edgar Peltenburg (28 May 1942 – 14 August 2016) was a Canadian archaeologist who specialised in excavations in Scotland, Syria and Cyprus. He was emeritus professor of archaeology at the University of Edinburgh.

References

External links

1942 births
2016 deaths
Deaths from cancer
Canadian archaeologists
Academics of the University of Edinburgh